The AMC Pacer is a two-door compact car produced in the United States by American Motors Corporation (AMC) from the 1975 through the 1980 model years. The Pacer was also made in Mexico by Vehículos Automotores Mexicanos (VAM) from 1976 until 1979 and positioned as a premium-priced luxury car.

Design work began in 1971. The rounded shape and large glass area were unusual compared with the three-box designs of the era. The Pacer's width is equal to full-sized domestic vehicles at the time, and this unique design feature was promoted by AMC as "the first wide small car." The Pacer was the first modern, mass-produced, U.S. automobile design using the cab forward concept.

Reviews upon its introduction used descriptions like "futuristic, bold, and unique." The Pacer featured an aerodynamic "jellybean" styling, numerous innovations such as different door lengths, and was noted "as a space-efficient car, seemingly from the future.". The Pacer stood out a time when "Detroit was still rolling out boat-sized gas guzzlers."

Design
American Motors' chief stylist Dick Teague began work on the Pacer in 1971, anticipating an increase in demand for smaller vehicles throughout the decade. The new car was designed to offer the interior room and feel of a big car that drivers of traditional domestic automobiles were accustomed to, but in a much smaller, aerodynamic, and purposefully distinctive exterior package. American Motors called it "Project Amigo" as a fresh design "featuring a body style not seen before, using the latest technology and exceeding upcoming safety regulations."

Car and Driver magazine noted that "AMC said it was the first car designed from the inside out. Four passengers were positioned with reasonable clearances and then the rest of the car was built around them as compactly as possible." American Motors explored many unique solutions to what Teague called the "Urban Concept" car. Not only different sized doors for the driver and passenger sides were considered, but also using a Wankel engine and front-wheel-drive.

The shape was highly rounded with a huge glass area and was very unusual for its time. Road & Track magazine described it as "fresh, bold and functional-looking". The May 1976 issue of Car and Driver dubbed it "The Flying Fishbowl," and it was also described as "the seventies answer to George Jetson's mode of transportation" at a time when "Detroit was still rolling out boat-sized gas guzzlers."

Development was under Product Group Vice President Gerald C. Meyers, whose goal was to develop a car that was unique: "everything that we do must distinguish itself as being importantly different than what can be expected from the competition." Even before its introduction, AMC's Board Chairman Roy D. Chapin, Jr. described "It will be a visibly different car, maybe even controversial. It's an idea that represents a transition between what has been and what's coming. Today versus tomorrow." According to Popular Mechanics, "This is the first time in the history of the American automobile industry that a car manufacturer has said in advance of bringing out a new product that some people may not like it."

A number of futuristic ideas were explored by AMC, but the automaker lacked adequate resources to build components from scratch. Instead, they needed to use outside suppliers or adapt certain existing parts for use in their own production facilities. Unique for a comparatively small car, the Pacer was as wide as a full-size American car of the era. American Motors did not describe it as "cab forward," but the Pacer's layout included wheels pushed to the corners (short overhangs), a relatively wide body, and A-pillars moved forward. The windshield was placed over part of the engine compartment, with the bottom edge of the glass forward of the firewall. Contrary to myth, the Pacer was not widened six inches (152.4 mm) to make room for the rear-wheel drive configuration. The editor of Road & Track asserted that front-wheel drive, as well as a transverse mid-engined configuration, were among "various mechanical layouts ... tossed around by the idea people at AMC," adding that "it's unlikely they ever had much hope of being able to produce anything other than their traditional front engine and rear drive, using components already in production."

The introductory 1975 AMC advertising and literature proclaimed it as "the first wide small car." The width was dictated partly by marketing strategy—American drivers were accustomed to large vehicles and the Pacer's occupants had the impression of being in a larger car—and partly by the fact that many of AMC's assembly lines were already set up for full-size cars.

Teague's low-drag design, which predated the fuel crisis and the flood of small foreign imports into the American market, was highly innovative. Pacer's drag coefficient of 0.43 was relatively low for that time. Teague even eliminated rain gutters, smoothly blending the tops of the doors into the roof—an aerodynamic detail that, although criticized at the time for allowing rain onto the front seat, has become the norm in today's designs.

Also unique was that the passenger door was four inches (101 mm) longer than the driver's on the left side. This made passenger loading easier, particularly from the rear seats; and they would also tend to use the safer curbside in countries that drive on the right.

An entirely fresh approach was also taken by AMC engineers with the Pacer's front suspension and engine mounting. It was the first U.S. small car to isolate the engine and suspension system noises from the passenger compartment. The entire front suspension was mounted on a crossmember isolated from the frame extensions by heavy rubber bushings. It is also different from all other AMC cars with the coil spring between the two control arms, seated on the lower wishbone arm at the bottom and in the suspension/engine mount crossmember at the top. The rear suspension was also isolated, requiring a special tool to press the one-piece bushings in and out of the mounting brackets.

Other aspects of the Pacer were designed for ease of service, including the dashboard and instrument panel—using a minimum number of easily accessible screws and featuring a removable cover/bezel without the need to disconnect the speedometer cable—and access to the light bulbs. The Pacer's design was ranked as equal with the new Aspen-Volare compacts as the most serviceable in the industry.

The Pacer was the second American production car, after the Ford Pinto, to feature rack-and-pinion steering. The system was mounted low at the front of the crossmember. The body was designed with the aim that structural lines protected it from hit damage and AMC engineers claimed that they succeeded in more than 50% of the car surface.

In the mid-1970s, the U.S. government mandated major safety improvements for vehicles starting with the 1980 model year. "Full-circle body protection was designed into the Pacer, starting with the energy-absorbing bumper mounts" through upper and lower box-section rails on each side extending back to the front pillars, as well as from the bases of the pillars behind the doors, the box-section members in the body floor curve up and back in past the rear wheel houses. The Pacer was designed from the start to meet the expected stringent safety specifications.

The low beltline and window design afforded the driver outstanding visibility. The Pacer had laminated safety glass in the windshield. The articulated front wipers were hidden when in their parked position while a rear wiper and washer system was optional.

General Motors, Ford, and Chrysler persuaded the government that it was not financially viable to modify existing production cars to comply with the new regulations and that instead each company would be put to the enormous expense of producing new, safety-compliant vehicles. Accordingly, the government requirements were reduced, which led to the deletion of several safety features from the production Pacer—for example, the roll bar over the passenger compartment, and the bump in the roof that accommodated it. The design of the Pacer was strong for a small car, making it solid and heavy with protection features that included strong and massive bumpers, as well as wide B-pillars that factory information bulletins described their "roll bar like characteristics." Even with the Pacer's large glass area, passengers are not near the windows because they all bow out from around the occupants. The Pacer's wide stance also makes it stable and provides a unique feeling when inside the car, giving credence to the marketing phrase used by AMC that "you only ride like a Pacer if you're wide like a Pacer."

The editors of The Motor opined the "more you study both the general layout and the detail features of the Pacer, the more convinced you become that the men who dreamed it up and decided to make it actually do drive around in crowded cities and consequently realize from their own experience that the traditional big barges are less and less easy to navigate through our streets." The unusual proportions of the Pacer provided buyers the "idea of feeling like they were sitting in the front of a roomy big American car, but without all the unnecessary length." Car and Driver road testers also noted the Pacer's "smooth and quiet ride can probably be attributed to a front subframe that isolates the passenger capsule from the engine, suspension and steering loads" making the car "eminently stable and controllable, with its rack-and-pinion steering and wide track."

The Pacer's remaining safety features were not strongly advertised, and seldom influenced a potential customer's purchasing decision. The car's extra weight—due in part to the safety equipment and the abundance of heavy glass—hurt fuel economy: production models tested by the United States Environmental Protection Agency (EPA) gave  in the city, but  or better on the highway (depending on driving habits and transmission), thanks to aerodynamic efficiency.

Originally, the car was designed for a Wankel rotary engine. In 1973, AMC signed a licensing agreement with Curtiss-Wright to build Wankels for cars and Jeep-type vehicles. (The agreement also permitted Curtiss-Wright to sell rotaries elsewhere.) Later, AMC decided instead to purchase the engines from General Motors (GM), who were developing them for use in their own cars. However, GM canceled development in 1974 for reasons that included durability issues, the fuel crisis, tooling costs (for the engines and also for a new product line designed to take advantage of the rotary's ultra-compact dimensions), and the upcoming (the late 1970s) U.S. emissions legislation. It was also thought that the high-revving Wankel would not suit Americans accustomed to low revs and high torque.

General Motors's change of plans left the Pacer without an engine. American Motors took a calculated risk and introduced the new model. The company's over-commitment to the project resulted in entrapment with so much money and effort in the car's design. Engineers hastily reconfigured it to accept their existing straight-six engine. This involved a complete redesign of the drivetrain and firewall to keep the longer engine within the body dimensions designed for the Wankel, but allowed the Pacer to share many mechanical components with other AMC models. Newsweek noted the "Pacer's primary competitive drawback is gasoline mileage: AMC offers only six-cylinder engines and the car gets only 18 miles per gallon in the city and suburban driving vs. 23 mpg or more for some four-cylinder competitors."

The "outside of the box" thinking incorporated by AMC in the Pacer as the first "wide, small car" attempted to capture a revolutionary change in the marketplace, but a radical departure from what was accepted by consumers as "good styling" was a risky strategy. Only the largest firms can stick with a radical element until it "grows," and the automaker's dominance in the marketplace may eventually establish it as a standard feature. However, by the late 1970s the styling research axiom no longer applied that if a car with some controversial styling was liked by at least half of the potential market segment; then chances were good that this feature was a differential advantage for the manufacturer. The AMC Pacer incorporated many controversial styling and design innovations that led to its market failure after five model years.

American Motors developed the Pacer by identifying emerging trends and design technologies, but it faced a small window of opportunity since a product that comes out either too early or too late can fail even if the opportunity was there initially. A further complication was the purchasing dynamics and the Pacer's design was focused on maximizing the internal sense of space, while the market focused on external dimensions. Many of the attributes the Pacer incorporated became the goal of all manufacturers in the two decades that followed.

With an uncommonly wide and short body for a small car, the Pacer's design is still considered controversial while its powerplants did not contribute to fuel economy. Nevertheless, "the foresight by Teague and AMC was correct" with approaches to meet the evolving U.S. government regulations covering automobiles (such as the Highway Safety Act of 1970 and the new National Highway Traffic Safety Administration).

Production

Introduced in showrooms on 28 February 1975, the Pacer was designed to attract buyers of traditional large cars to a smaller package during a time when gasoline prices were projected to rise dramatically. In its first year of production, the Pacer sold well, with 145,528 units. There was little competition from other American manufacturers, most of whom had been blindsided by the oil crisis. The increased demand for compact, economy vehicles was growing rapidly. However, Pacer sales fell after the first two years, though the car continued to be built through the 1980 model year. Similar to its mid-year introduction, on 3 December 1979, production of the Pacer ended at the Kenosha, Wisconsin assembly plant where it had begun five years earlier. A total of 280,000 cars were built. Increasing competition from the Big Three U.S. automakers and the rapid consumer shift to imported cars during the late 1970s are cited as the reasons for this outcome. Automobile buyers in the U.S. became adjusted to smaller and lighter cars, particularly the imports that offered better gas mileage presented, the AMC Pacer could not match the German and Japanese cars. Also the large glass areas increased the car's weight. Moreover, AMCs partnership with Renault brought the Renault 5 named "Le Car" to the AMC dealers as a more economical model. The design of the Pacer provided inspiration to the restyling of the Renault 5 to meet the needs and requirements of the American Market.

The Pacer's unconventional styling was commonly cited in its lack of success. Other concerns included a lack of cargo space when carrying a full load of passengers (because of its short wheelbase). Drivers also cited a lack of power. The Pacer was heavy; Car & Driver wrote, "American Motors had already quoted a curb weight of 2990 lb. for the basic Pacer when we first wrote about the car, and that already seemed quite heavy; but when we weighed the test car (whose air conditioning, automatic transmission, power steering and so forth would not account for the full difference) it registered an astounding 3425 lb.", and the standard  I6, with a single-barrel carburetor and optimized for low emissions (all vehicles at the time carried emissions-reducing devices, including exhaust gas recirculation); was relatively low-powered ("The Pacer comes with either of two AMC inline six-cylinder engines, both producing 100 bhp, but the larger 258-cu-in. unit delivering better mid-range torque"). In 1976, a "High Output" version of the  engine was offered, which helped performance at the cost of higher fuel consumption. By the time a  V8 was offered in 1978, the company had introduced a successful line of "luxury-compact" models (the AMC Concord). Additionally, gasoline prices remained high, limiting demand for V8-powered vehicles.

For increased cargo capacity, a station wagon body style was offered from 1977. The wagon version was only five inches longer (127 mm) and weighed only  more than the coupe. It was also a less unusual-looking design with a squared-off back and straight, almost upright, rear side windows. Although front vent windows were optional on all Pacers, the wagon's rear side glass featured vent windows as standard. The rear seat also folded flat to form a continuation of the cargo floor. Some wagon models featured simulated woodgrain trim on the lower body sides and the liftgate.

Model designations
 

The Pacer started out as an economy car, and eventually became a small luxury car. There were several available comfort, convenience, and appearance packages while the range of options increased over the model years.

"X" Package: Available on the Pacer coupe from 1975 until 1977. The trim package consisted of vinyl bucket seats, a sports steering wheel, and custom trim, as well as a floor-mounted gear shift and front sway bar. The model received exterior chrome features, styled road wheels, Pacer X decals on the doors, and other package identification. For 1978 a "Sport Package" replaced the X-Package, and included bucket seats, sports steering wheel, seven combinations of two-tone paint for upper and lower bodyside, and slot-styled road wheels with radial tires. The option package was available only with the  I6 or  V8 engine.

"D/L" Package: A more upscale edition, the D/L was available for the entire run of the car and became the base model in 1978. The package originally included "Navajo design" seating fabric and a woodgrain instrument panel as well as some interior features that were otherwise optional. The exterior had additional chrome accents, different wheel covers, and identification badging.

"Limited": Available in 1979–1980, the Limited had leather seats, extra soundproofing, and deeper-pile carpet (18-oz. vs. the standard 12-oz) as standard, plus amenities that were otherwise options, including AM radio, power door locks, power windows, and tilt steering wheel. The exterior had chrome accents, styled road wheels, and "Limited" badging.

"Sundowner": Available through AMC dealers in California for 1975 only, the Sundowner was a basic $3,599 (suggested retail price) Pacer with options that listed for $300 included at no extra cost. In addition to the mandatory California engine emissions controls and bumper guards, the package included "Basketry Weave" fabric upholstery with coordinated trim on the door panels, plus remote control exterior mirror, rear window washer and wiper, styled road wheels with whitewall tires, and a roof rack.

"Levi's" Package: Introduced for the 1977 model year to capitalize on the popularity of the Levi's Gremlin and Hornet, the Levi's Pacer had blue denim-like upholstery and door-panel trim, with small Levi's tags on the front seats. The copper buttons in AMC's other Levi's models were omitted, and a Levi's logo sticker was applied on the front fender. The version, which could be combined with the Pacer X package, did not sell in large numbers and it was dropped for the 1978 model year.

Carl Green Enterprises (CGE) Pacers: these cars, modified by automobile designer Carl Green, had  AMC V8 engines plus flares, air dams, and wings. The CGE Pacers appeared in Hot Rod, Popular Hot Rodding, and Car & Driver magazines. Green also built two Pacer pace cars for B.F. Goodrich to use in the International Motor Sports Association circuit, and provided body kits for Amos Johnson's Team Highball racecars.

Pacers without the optional vinyl roof trim could be finished in several unique two-tone paint combinations, with front and rear scuff molding extensions on the body sides. The two-tone treatment was changed in 1977 to an "up and over the roof" accent paint scheme for the remainder of production.

Moving toward more luxury features, power door locks became available in 1978, and in 1979 power windows joined the options list. For both 1979 and 1980, a hood ornament and center chrome hood strip were added.

Show cars

Pacer Stinger
For the 1976 auto show circuit, AMC developed a customized Pacer Stinger. The exterior featured matte black painted lower body panels and yellow pearl paint that faded to a pale yellow on the roof. The back half of the car had over-the-roof matte black "bumblebee stripes" that continued on the tailgate. The Stinger was fitted with oversize radial tires mounted on Jackman Star (brand) aluminum racing road wheels, a side-mounted exhaust, NACA duct on the hood, auxiliary Cibié (brand) driving lights, as well as a front spoiler and wheel well fender extensions. The Stinger's interior was black with a floor-mounted shifter and front bucket seats with a center console. Black and yellow stripes on the front and rear seats completed the "bumblebee" theme, while the black door panels had yellow side cushions.

AM Van
The 1977 AM Van is a custom van in three-quarter scale with Pacer lines. Designed by Richard Teague and based on an existing car platform, but without an interior and no mechanical components. Proposed features included four-wheel drive and it had a "turbo" decal on the double side-opening rear doors. Displayed as one of seven "Concept 80" auto show circuit tour, it was voted as being the most appealing, receiving 31% of the votes. It never moved past the concept stage, but "inadvertently foreshadowed the minivan craze that would sweep America in the mid-1980s" as well as the "small worker van" market segment.

Crown Pacer
American Motors was evaluating the Pacer as a compact personal luxury model with the Crown Pacer concept car that was shown at the 1978 show circuit. Starting with the Detroit Auto Show in the fall of 1977, AMC aimed to create a luxury image for the Pacer. Finished in pearlescent white with a two-section vinyl-covered roof that was padded, the Crown Pacer's exterior featured gold accents - including the spokes of the wire wheels. Pictures from the Chicago Auto Show show it with an interior upholstered in white leather and numerous luxury features such as a large inbuilt sun roof, real wire wheels, full rocker panel bright trim, color-matched integrated flexible front and fear fascia and bumper covers with black rubber guards and impact (nerf) strips as well as a full-width grille that also hid the headlights.

Electric Pacers

Some AMC Pacers were converted to plug-in electric vehicles.

Electric Vehicle Associates (EVA) of Cleveland was best known for its Change of Pace model – a built-to-order adaptation of the Pacer that was priced at $12,360 in 1978. The company converted over 100 units.

First available in the sedan version, power came from eighteen 6-volt lead–acid batteries to a  series DC motor with a stock three-speed automatic transmission. Regenerative braking is used in conjunction with the standard hydraulic brake system which utilizes front-wheel discs and rear drums. Vehicle tests that focused on the electrical drive system including the batteries, controller, and motor "found that the Pacer performance is approximately equal to the majority of the vehicles tested in the 1977 assessment."

The electric Pacer wagon was one of the more expensive cars at $14,000. The Lead Industries Association (LIA) sponsored a tour for government and industry officials that featured an EVA Pacer wagon. Consolidated Edison in New York City purchased 40 modified AMC Pacers from EVA. The United States Army also included EVA Pacers in its inventory of special-purpose electric vehicles.

A video documentary about the Electric Vehicle Association's electric Pacers is titled "A change of Pace." A fully restored wagon has had its original silicon-controlled rectifier (SCR) control replaced with a modern controller and the "hydraulically operated hybrid vehicle recharging system" removed because of its lack of efficiency to use compressed air from suspension travel to power a small generator to recharge the batteries.

International markets

Europe

American Motors exported the Pacer to several European nations. Jean-Charles, the AMC distributor in Paris, France, compared the rounded body of the new Pacer to the buttocks of an attractive woman in magazine advertisements. Cars exported to Europe were available in higher trim levels.

Sales were not very good, but in Belgium, a brand-new Pacer could be purchased as late as 1983.

United Kingdom
American Motors vehicles were exported to the United Kingdom during the 1960s and 1970s and sold by Rambler Motors (A.M.C.) Ltd in London with dealers in London, Yorks, Kent, and Worcester. While other models such as the Rambler Classic, Rebel, Ambassador, and Matador had been exported as completed factory right-hand-drive vehicles, the Pacer was only built with left-hand drive. A British company, C.T. Wooler, in Andover, Hampshire had been in the business for a long time converting LHD cars to RHD and entered into an agreement with AMC to convert AMC vehicles. C.T. Wooler converted the Pacer to right-hand drive by leaving the majority of the steering gear on the left-hand side of the car, and running a chain-drive behind the dashboard from the steering wheel (now on the right-hand side) to the top of the steering column. The car retained its unequal-length doors, designed for LHD markets, meaning that in the UK the longer door was on the driver's side, leaving the passengers to use the smaller door, which "in the typically confined British parking spot was virtually impossible". The Pacer was wider than a Rolls-Royce Silver Shadow and slightly longer than the then-current Ford Cortina. The British motoring press adversely reviewed the car and AMC soon stopped exporting it.

Mexico
The Pacer was produced in Mexico by Vehículos Automotores Mexicanos (VAM) starting in 1976. They were marketed as premium-priced luxury cars. The VAM versions came with different engines, interiors, and other components because vehicles made in Mexico had to have at least 60% locally sourced parts. The engine was an AMC design, but modified and built by VAM. A unique to Mexico  straight-six engine was standard. It was designed to cope with low octane fuel and high altitudes. This engine featured dished pistons with a  bore and  stroke, as well as a unique head and exhaust porting design. Not available in Mexico were the V8 engine, four-speed transmission, three-speed transmission with an overdrive unit, or the station wagon body style.

1976
The initial VAM Pacers were the equivalents to AMC's domestic Pacer DL models, except for a longer list of standard equipment and had some of the features later included on AMC's "Limited" models. The VAM Pacer was offered in one version and had no model or trim badges. The standard engine was VAM's  I6 producing  with 7.7:1 compression ratio, 266-degree camshaft, and a Holley 2300 two-barrel carburetor coupled to a steel intake manifold. The initial production featured a T-150 three-speed manual transmission with a heavy-duty clutch and a 3.31:1 rear gear ratio. All VAM Pacers came with heavy-duty suspension (front sway bar with heavy-duty springs and shock absorbers), power brakes with front disks, power rack and pinion steering, a larger radiator with coolant recovery tank, rigid four-bladed cooling fan, and electronic ignition.

Standard convenience features included a custom luxury steering wheel, column-mounted manual shifter, woodgrain dashboard trim, inside hood release, individual reclining front seats with adjustable headrests, center folding armrest, fixed two-point seatbelts, two-speed electric wipers, electric washers integrated into the wiper arms, 140 km/h speedometer, courtesy lights, monaural AM radio with a single in-dash speaker, electric analog clock, heater with windshield defroster, lighter, dashboard ashtray, locking glove box, tinted windshield, plastic door panels with cloth insert and pull strap, dual rear ashtrays, folding down rear bench seat, trunk carpet, sound-insulating cardboard-type headliner (US base model type), and round dome light.

The external appearance and equipment of the VAM Pacer consisted of a full bright molding package (wheel lips, top edges of the hood and fenders, window surrounds, rocker panels), a bright rear panel between the taillights and the rear license plate housing, protective side moldings, front and rear bumper guards, bumper nerfing strips, five-mile-per-hour bumpers with recovering shocks (only VAM car with this characteristic along with the Matador-based Classic line), five-spoke in-house VAM wheels, trim rings and full cover volcano center caps on the wheels, ER78x14 radial tires, driver's side manual remote mirror, radio antenna on the passenger's side fender, squared VAM logo emblems on the fenders, Pacer emblems on the fenders and bright rear panel and a two-step hood latch.

The positioning of the VAM Pacer was different compared to the initial marketing by AMC in its domestic market. The car was focused to be a futuristic and high-end luxury car from its introduction, while the AMC counterpart was first targeted as a small car to consumers accustomed to large vehicles and AMC later repositioned it as a more upscale model. This strategy was reinforced after the first 200 units produced when the three-speed automatic transmission became standard equipment list and added an "Automático" emblem on the bright rear panel. The VAM Pacer became the most costly and luxurious VAM car at the mid-year discontinuation of the 1976 Classic line. The uniqueness of the model coupled with its level of luxury and price range made the Pacer a default flagship model for the company. However, the 'luxury compact' was not a known segment to Mexican consumers.

An unusual aspect of the 1976 VAM Pacer was its seat upholstery. VAM's design was based on AMC's Oleg Cassini interior for the 1974–1975 Matador coupe. This "haute couture" interior was featured in the Pacer as well as in all three VAM Classic models for the year. The Pacer's seats incorporated a golden Cassini crest on the adjustable headrests and a pattern with copper buttons forming squares. Unlike the AMC Pacer, the VAM Pacer included many standard features and only a few factory options. These included a rear wiper and washer, rear defroster, reading dome light, trunk cover, remote-controlled driver's side mirror, luxury wheel covers, and heavy-duty cooling system (seven-bladed flexible fan and fan shroud). A universal air conditioning system was available only as a dealership option.

1977
The 1977 VAM Pacer was almost the same as in the previous year on the outside, but made more luxurious inside. The Cassini-style upholstery was replaced with a more discreet luxury design with a "zigzag" placement of plain soft buttons on the upholstery forming diagonal lines. The AM monaural radio was replaced by an AM/FM monaural unit, three-point retractable seatbelts replaced the lap-only units, and a light for the glove compartment was now standard. The  engine underwent engineering upgrades that included an all-new head design with an improved cooling system and quench-type combustion chambers, a higher 8.0:1 compression ratio, and a new two-barrel aluminum intake manifold, while the rear differential gear ratio changed from 3.31:1 to 3.07:1. These upgrades gave the VAM Pacer an estimated 12 net horsepower increase over the previous year with improved fuel economy as well as increased top speed while maintaining torque and the car's towing capacity. This was also the first year that VAM models could be ordered with a factory air conditioning system. Pacers with the A/C included five dashboard air vents as well as a 55-amp alternator, a flexible seven-bladed cooling fan, a three-row radiator, and a fan shroud. The previously optional luxury wheel covers were made standard equipment.

1978
The 1978 model year VAM Pacers gained new hood and grille designs. The only technical difference of the year was the replacement of the Holley 2300 carburetor in favor of a Motorcraft 2150 unit with a built-in altitude compensator despite having a slightly lower flow. This reduced power but enhanced emission certification and was more reliable in changing altitudes. New standard features included a hood light, a speedometer in both kilometers and miles per hour, door panels including a vertical stripe pattern over their top edges, a different AM/FM radio model, a new flat-faced luxury steering wheel design with an AMC logo, and new seat designs. The heater was improved in the form of air vents appearing to the left of the instrument cluster, the center of the dashboard above the ashtray, and over the top right corner of the glovebox door regardless of the presence of the air conditioning system. The heater controls were revised, obtaining the VENT option in airflow selection, which was now a sliding lever instead of the five buttons used in the prior two years. The two remaining air vents, the passenger's side one over the top left corner of the glove box door and the vent on the driver's side integrated under the steering column were included with the A/C system.

1979

The 1979 VAM Pacer was a continuation of the 1978 model in terms of appearance, with the exceptions of the previously standard wheel covers and a new hood bright molding with front ornament. All VAM Pacers now featured VAM's in-house five-spoke wheels with trim rings and chrome volcano hubcaps with exposed lug nuts. New seat designs with a horizontally striped pattern and Barcelona crests on the headrests were a luxury feature (identical to the AMC Matador Barcelona version), a new steering wheel design with a soft rectangular center button, all-new door panels designs in plastic and vinyl with a rigid top pull strap and sliding locks with woodgrain accents. The headliner was changed to a cloth-wrapped unit. VAM began using the net rating system for measuring engine output. The electrical system was revised with a new fuse box located under the dashboard on the driver's side firewall. A total of 369 VAM Pacers were sold.

VAM Pacer X 
A new model was introduced in 1979, the VAM Pacer X, with a high-performance focus. It featured a high-output version of the  engine with a higher 8.5:1 compression ratio, a semi-ported head, centrifugal advance-modified electronic distributor for higher acceleration, a set of headers with two final outlets divided between the first three and second three cylinders (even though a final single exhaust was used through a Y-shaped portion), and the return of the Holley 2300 two-barrel carburetor. The output for this engine, code-named "4.6 SX" is estimated at  net at 4000 rpm. This engine made the Pacer X the second-best performing VAM car of 1979, surpassing by a single tenth of a second the four-speed American Rally AMX (Concord AMX equivalent) with its standard  in VAM's acceleration tests.

The Pacer X was available in only three colors (black, white, and wine red), included colored-matched bumpers, and had most of the bright trim deleted. The model featured thin golden stripes surrounding the door and side glass areas extending through the roof from side to side, the VAM eight-spoke sports steel wheels were painted in gold with blacked-out volcano hubcaps, the rear and side glass moldings were also blacked out, and "Pacer X" decals were on the lower front corners of the doors. The Pacer X interior included unique reclining front bucket seats, a center console with a locking compartment and ashtray instead of an armrest, a set of "rallye" gauges (water temperature, clock, ammeter, and oil pressure) instead of the in-dashboard ashtray, a 6000 rpm tachometer in place of the electric clock, three-arm spoked sports steering wheel with a circular horn button with a VAM logo, floor-mounted three-speed automatic transmission, remote-controlled driver's side door mirror, and reading dome lights. Air conditioning was standard in this model and most units included a tinted glass pop-up sunroof. The remaining equipment was the same as the standard model: power brakes, power steering, front sway bar, as well as heavy-duty shock absorbers and springs, 3.07:1 rear axle ratio, heavy-duty cooling system, AM/FM monaural radio, tinted windshield, light group, inside hood release, and three-point retractable seatbelts. The VAM Pacer X was limited to 250 units and is the most collectible Pacer model in Mexico.

A total of 619 VAM Pacers were produced during 1979. Unlike the U.S. market AMC Pacer, 1979 was the last year of the line in Mexico.

Motorsports
A 1976 Pacer was driven by Gordon Olsen and Bob Stone in the 1979 SCORE Baja 1000 Pro Class race and finished Class 6 (production cars) in second place, behind a Ford Ranchero truck. With a high rate of dropouts, "anyone that officially finishes a Baja race is a winner." Although many questioned "What's a nice odd econo-car like you doing in an off-road race?", the car was doing very well with Olsen swapping the lead with the V8 powered truck. However, an impact resulted in the destruction of the Pacer's radiator giving the lead to the Ford truck after 21 hours and 20 minutes of racing.

Reviews
The May 1976 issue of Car and Driver dubbed it "The Flying Fishbowl," and it was also described as "the seventies answer to George Jetson's mode of transportation".

A 2005 Hemmings Classic Car magazine article said that in 1975 the Pacer was "sleek" and "audacious"; "it looked like the car of the future" and "the automotive press loved it."  Motor Trend magazine, one of many that pictured the car on the cover, said it was "the most creative, most people oriented auto born in the U.S. in 15 years".

Consumer Reports described that the Pacer "scored quite high in our tests. We would not hesitate to recommend it to anyone who wants a fairly small car." The report concluded that the Pacer did "at least as well as the Dodge Dart, the Plymouth Valiant, and the Chevrolet Nova, the U.S. compacts we like best," and that "overall, the Pacer scored better than such domestic subcompacts like the Ford Pinto, the Chevrolet Vega, and AMC's own Gremlin."

Small Cars magazine noted that "admiration was an obvious reaction" at the press preview, and that "the knowledgeable product writers knew without being told that they were privileged to be there to see something new in automobile design." Road & Track ran a cover story with design and engineering details.

Michael Lamm, writing in Popular Mechanics, commented on many "thoughtful touches that distinguish AMC's strikingly futuristic new Pacer". He said the ride was "not choppy as in so many short-wheelbase cars", the rack-and-pinion steering gave "handling a feeling of precision ... sticking well in turns, with hard cornering generally solid and predictable", the "tight turning radius" made parking "easy", and the steering wheel was too big. Summing up, he said that with its "very modern styling, ample power and generous interior" the Pacer was "more car" than "the Mustang II or "GM's sporty compacts (Monza, Skyhawk/Starfire)", and that its performance felt "strong—certainly on a par with most V8s."

Don Sherman wrote in the February 1975 issue of Car and Driver that it was "our first real urban transporter...There is, of course, the chance of monumental failure; it might be another Tucker ahead of its time ... But...with its high priority on comfortable and efficient travel and absence of Mach 2 styling, [it] at least seems right for the current state of duress. Consider this bold offering from AMC a test: Are we buying cars for transportation yet, or are they still social props?"

The April 1975 issue of Road & Track road test article described the Pacer's appearance as "bold, clean and unique...even when it's going 60 mph it looks as if it's standing still..." but noted that, even with the test car's optional front disc brakes, "in the usual panic-stop tests...our driver had one of his most anxious moments ever as the Pacer screeched, skidded and demanded expert attention at the steering wheel to keep from going altogether out of control. The histrionics are reflected in long stopping distances from highway speeds... [The car's] engineering—old-fashioned and unimaginative in the extreme—does not match the perky design", which the magazine declared "most attractive to look at and pleasant to sit in."

In a follow-up road test in August 1976, Motor Trend wrote: "Since its introduction in January 1975, we have been quite smitten with AMC's Pacer." The magazine criticized the performance and the absence of a 4-speed transmission. A 2-barrel carburetor was offered on the larger six at the end of 1975, as well as a 4-speed manual, but the testers noted that although "the 2-bbl Pacer was faster than the 1-bbl car by a fair margin, it did not 'feel' faster" (author's emphasis). They commended the car's comfort: "Even with its compact exterior dimensions, the Pacer is one of the most comfortable 4-passenger cars around...The wide bucket seats were firm, but very comfortable...Front passenger leg room is extraordinary even with the seat racked well forward, and the rear seat leg room exceeds such full-sizers as the Buick Riviera and Continental Mark IV."

The British press was critical, and the cover of The Motor, a weekly automobile magazine, stated: "We test the Pacer – and wish we hadn't." A retrospective by the industry publication Automotive News described the 1975 debut of the Pacer as "one of Detroit's more polarizing designs." 

Popular Mechanics magazine described the newly added 1977 station wagon body style as a "styling coup", and said: "who needs the coupe!" The Pacer has been described as "amazingly versatile and quite advanced for the times."

By 1978 the luster had worn off the design, and as more sophisticated competitors were introduced, the press began criticizing the lack of power and performance. Nevertheless, after almost fifty years, reviews describe the "intriguing" AMC Pacer with its virtues as "call it brave, stupid or both, but you don’t get cars like this any more."

Collectibility

Collector of classic car publication Hemmings Motor News noted that small cars have always played a role in the U.S. automotive history, and that "among those produced during the late Seventies, the AMC Pacer was an economical giant, in a manner of speaking." Now old enough to be a "classic car", the Pacer has come to be regarded in some quarters as a 1970s design icon. According to Business Week, the 1970s were "infamous for disco, Watergate and some of the ugliest cars ever." Most cars in the U.S. from the early 1970s are noted more for their power than their styling, but they even lost their power by late 1970. Many automobiles began to lose their character and looked the same across brands and automakers, as well as focusing on "luxury" features such as vinyl roofs and non-functional opera windows. The "roly-poly" Pacer was one of the few of that era that had "real personalities" and it embodies a sense of "artful desperation" making it "stand out from the crowd and epitomize at once the best and worst of the seventies." The Pacer's "jellybean" styling has made it an icon of the 1970s.

Cars of the 1970s era such as the Pacer are becoming collectors' items. Business Week magazine reported that the rising values of so-called "nerd cars"—ugly 1970s-era cars—prompted the CEO of a major collector-car insurance company to buy a Pacer which has "inexplicably appreciated substantially beyond the $2,300 that he paid for it in 2004." In 2002 he said: "In what can sometimes be a sea of automotive sameness, the AMC Pacer continues to turn heads even today". A survey with 4,000 respondents chose the Ford Edsel, Pacer, Chevrolet Corvair, Nash Metropolitan, and the Volkswagen Beetle as models with poor ratings, but they are now sought after by collectors.

The Pacer has been described as one of the formerly unloved cars from the 1970s that are enjoying a resurgence in both collectibility and auto restoration — especially among fans of cars from that era. The Pacer is one of several 1970s cars that were always thought of as cheap vehicles; therefore they were poorly maintained, which reduced their life expectancy. Also the heavy engines used in the car put more load on the front suspension than intended, which caused the rack and pinion steering to fail on Pacers built in 1975. Although "more people collect Ford Mustangs than AMC Pacers, this does not make the Mustang more collectable than a Pacer" depending on the individual collector's likes, prices, and availability. According to CNN Money, Pacer values are on the rise. Restored cars are acheving record prices on auctions.

The Pacer's originality, as well as its deficiencies, are appreciated, if not loved, by car hobbyists and serious collectors alike. Although "automotive oddity" is a recognition that the Pacer gets for its contribution to history, some owners appreciate them and have also upgraded them with the modern AMC 4.0 Jeep engine as a "low-buck, dare to be different" automobile. A few owners have further modified Pacers into drag cars. An owner that registered their car for movie work earned more that their initial purchase from its use two movies: Confessions of a Dangerous Mind and The Human Stain. Opinions about the car's collectability have changed as both the wagon and sedan versions have appreciated in value as well as the Pacer's unusualness has now become an advantage. "No matter how you feel about the Pacer, 40 years after the last one was built, the wide-bodied boat is not only immediately recognizable, it's legendary." The Pacer's "mission was to transport four people in comfort" and today it is "definitely different ... and people notice it. Behind the wheel, you're an instant celebrity."

Ownership support
The classic vehicle publication Hemmings Motor News lists national and regional AMC automobile clubs. Pacers share the drivetrain as well as other parts and components with other AMC models, while new old stock (NOS), used, and reproduction parts are available from vendors specializing in AMC vehicles.

In popular culture

In 1976 an AMC Pacer X was used as product placement in the hit French film The Wing or the Thigh (L'aile ou la cuisse), driven by the French actor Coluche.

A 1977 Pacer D/L station wagon was featured in the 1977 hit movie Oh, God! which stars John Denver and George Burns in the title role. John Denver's character Jerry drives the car in several scenes, including one in which God makes rainfall only inside the car.

A blue 1976 AMC Pacer was used as the "Burgermobile" in the 1997 film Good Burger. The car was modified with a large hamburger encompassing the hood and other fast food-stylized decor attached to the rear bumper, hubcaps, windshield wipers, and roof. Two illuminated red arrows were also attached to the sides of the vehicle, both serving as turn signals. After the movie, the car was purchased by the International Hamburger Hall of Fame and the Hamburger Museum in Florida. In April 2019, the car was sold to Mike Johnson, owner of the Hi-Pointe Drive-In in St. Louis, Missouri.

A 1976 AMC Pacer Hatchback was a featured car in the 1992 movie Wayne's World, and again in the 1993 movie Wayne's World 2. The car is called the "mirthmobile" and is integral to the movie references for the culture as Wayne and Garth "are performing the seventies for the nineties." The Pacer used in both movies was painted bright blue with flame decals, with stock steel wheels and wheel covers in the front, and aftermarket chrome-plated steel wheels in the rear. It features a two-tone light blue-and-beige vinyl interior, as well as a licorice dispenser mounted in place of the overhead light in the headliner. Although the car appears throughout both movies, it is seen the most in the introductory scene of the first Wayne's World movie. Wayne Campbell (Mike Myers) inserts a cassette tape into the stereo of the Pacer, and Wayne, Garth Algar (Dana Carvey), and his friends enthusiastically enjoy listening to "Bohemian Rhapsody" by Queen. Modifications to the movie car included interior camera mounts, tow hooks welded to the front subframe, and the removal of the climate control system. The rear wheel wells were modified to accommodate aftermarket speaker boxes, the aforementioned licorice dispenser was added, and an additional cup holder was added to the Pacer's dashboard. The car was equipped with AMC's  I6 engine and an automatic transmission. 

After being unused for over 20 years, the Pacer was restored to the same specifications as in the movie. The body was stripped and repainted, the wheels were re-chromed, and the interior was re-covered, all to match the specifications of the screen car. A modern aftermarket head unit and speakers replaced the stereo equipment; these and the licorice dispenser are the only aftermarket parts installed on the car. OEM factory parts used to restore the car were all obtained NOS. The car was sold for $37,000 at the 2016 Barrett-Jackson Collector Car Auction in Las Vegas, Nevada.

In the 2011 film Cars 2, the character Acer and several other 1975 AMC Pacers serve as supporting antagonists.

In the 1995 animated film A Goofy Movie, Goofy's much-abused car is a thinly veiled, cartoonish version of a 1978 AMC Pacer station wagon. The elementary school attended by director Kevin Lima was near an AMC dealership.

An April 2015 episode of the TV program Wheeler Dealers documented the restoration and sale of a 1975 Pacer that according to the show's director, Michael Wood, is ready for classic status.

Notes

References

External links

 
 AMC Rambler Club encourages and promotes the preservation, restoration, and collection of automobiles produced by American Motors Corporation as well as collecting information and printed matter relating to these cars
 The American Motors Owners Association aiding and encouraging the use, enjoyment, preservation, and restoration of vehicles built by American Motors Corporation between 1954 and 1988 model years

Pacer
Rear-wheel-drive vehicles
Compact cars
Hatchbacks
Coupés
Station wagons
1980s cars
Cars introduced in 1975
Electric vehicles introduced in the 20th century